Micker Brook is a tributary of the River Mersey in North West England.

Known early in its course as Bollinhurst Brook and Norbury Brook, then Lady Brook, the river runs along the Ladybrook Valley westward and northward through Hazel Grove, Bramhall and Cheadle. It joins the River Mersey not far from the M60 motorway near to Cheadle Village, Stockport.

Course

Beginning as Bollinhurst Brook, the Brook flows down from the hills between Disley and Whaley Bridge where it feeds Bollinhurst Reservoir and Horse Copice Reservoir respectively. The Brook then flows between High Lane and Higher Poynton where it passes under an aqueduct carrying the Macclesfield Canal. At this point the Brook becomes Norbury Brook, it then passes close to Poynton Lake where it is joined by Poynton Brook and becomes Lady Brook. 

Lady Brook then proceeds to flow westward through the settlements of Bramhall, Cheadle Hulme and Cheadle Village where it is finally known as Micker Brook. It then flows past the Alexandra Hospital where it flows under the M60 motorway and is then joined by Chorlton Brook. The Brook then joins the River Mersey, which itself drains into the Irish Sea.

References

Rivers of Cheshire
Rivers of Greater Manchester
1Micker